Rafaï is a town and sub-prefecture on the Chinko River, in the Central African Republic prefecture of Mbomou. Its estimated population is about 14,000 people.

History
The Sultanate of Rafaï was the last of Ubangi-Shari to still have its sultan. The last sultan assumed the throne in 1909. On 12 March 2013 Rafaï was captured by Seleka rebels. On 3 March 2018 it was captured by UPC rebels, but three days later it was recaptured by Anti-balaka. On 26 March 2021 it was reported that 14 rebels with automatic weapons were stationed near centre of Rafaï. On 30 October armed forces returned to Rafai after eight years of absence.

Transport

Rafaï has a small civilian airport with a 4,249 foot unpaved runway.

Notes

Sub-prefectures of the Central African Republic
Populated places in Mbomou